The 2018 season is Madura United Football Club's 3rd competitive season, and its 2nd consecutive season in the top-flight of Indonesian football.

Players

Other players under contract

Out on loan

Transfers

1st leg

In:

Out:

2nd leg

In:

Out:

Competitions

Liga 1

Piala Indonesia

Statistics

Appearances and goals

|-
! colspan="16" style="background:#dcdcdc; text-align:center"| Goalkeepers

|-
! colspan="16" style="background:#dcdcdc; text-align:center"| Defenders

|-
! colspan="16" style="background:#dcdcdc; text-align:center"| Midfielders

|-
! colspan="16" style="background:#dcdcdc; text-align:center"| Forwards

|-
! colspan="16" style="background:#dcdcdc; text-align:center"| Players out on loan
|-

|-
! colspan="16" style="background:#dcdcdc; text-align:center"| Players left during season

|-

References

External links
 

Madura United